Disney XD is a brand of children's TV channels owned by The Walt Disney Company. Since its American debut on February 13, 2009, the brand was launched in other markets. The channel was formerly known as Toon Disney or Jetix in most areas.

Disney XD has considerably reduced its footprint in favor of those markets mainly being served by Disney+, with the network's remaining presence being the American, Canadian and Polish channels, with a Dutch time-share.

Current channels

Defunct channels

References 

Disney XD
Disney Channel related-lists
Disney XD Channels